Olympia Mill, also known as Pacific Mill, is a historic textile mill complex located at Columbia, South Carolina. It was built in 1899, and consists of a four-story, red brick, rectangular shaped, main mill building connected to a one and two-story red brick power plant. The main building is in the Romanesque Revival style and features terra cotta detailing, large segmental arched window openings, and twin pyramidal roofed towers. The complex also includes: a one-story brick power plant auxiliary building, a one-story storage building, and two small brick one-story gatehouses.

It was added to the National Register of Historic Places in 2005.

References

External links 
 Olympia Mill apartments

Industrial buildings and structures on the National Register of Historic Places in South Carolina
Romanesque Revival architecture in South Carolina
Industrial buildings completed in 1899
Buildings and structures in Columbia, South Carolina
National Register of Historic Places in Columbia, South Carolina
Cotton mills in the United States
1899 establishments in South Carolina
Apartment buildings in South Carolina